"Tossin' and Turnin'" is a song written by Ritchie Adams and Malou René, and originally recorded by Bobby Lewis in the fall of 1960. The record was released on the Beltone label in December 1960. It reached number one on both the Billboard Hot 100 on July 10, 1961, and R&B chart and has since become a standard on oldies compilations. It was named the number one single on the Billboard chart for 1961, after spending seven consecutive weeks at the top. It was also featured on the soundtrack for the 1978 film Animal House.

On the original hit single version, the track begins with Lewis singing "I couldn't sleep at all last night", and it appears this way on most oldies compilations. However, on some releases the song has a prelude, where Lewis sings "Baby...Baby...you did something to me", followed by a musical cue into the first verse. Lewis usually included this prelude when he performed the song live.  According to several sources, the personnel on the original hit recording included guitarist Wild Jimmy Spruill.

In 2008, Billboard magazine ranked the song as the 27th biggest song of all time that charted on the Billboard Hot 100, commemorating the 50th anniversary of the chart.  It is one of only six songs from the 1960s to spend at least seven weeks in the number one position on the Billboard Hot 100.

Charts

Weekly charts

All-time charts

See also
List of number-one R&B singles of 1961 (U.S.)
List of Hot 100 number-one singles of 1961 (U.S.)

References

External links
Members.home.nl

1961 songs
1961 singles
1965 singles
Bobby Lewis songs
The Guess Who songs
The Kingsmen songs
The Supremes songs
Joan Jett songs
Lulu (singer) songs
Billboard Hot 100 number-one singles
Cashbox number-one singles
Songs written by Ritchie Adams